James Robertson Beattie is a Scottish musician who co-founded Primal Scream and later went on to form Spirea X and Adventures in Stereo.

Biography
Beattie formed Primal Scream in 1982 along with Bobby Gillespie. Beattie and Gillespie were the core members of the band until Beattie left after the release of the band's debut album, Sonic Flower Groove in 1987, thus seeing the band taking a more rock-oriented direction and their relocation to Brighton. During his tenure with the band Beattie wrote "Velocity Girl", which was included on the NME'''s C86 compilation. Beattie formed Spirea X with girlfriend Judith Boyle in 1988, the band named after a Primal Scream B-side.Larkin, Colin (1998) The Virgin Encyclopedia of Indie & New Wave, Virgin Books, p. 404 Spirea X split up in 1993, and Beattie and Boyle went on to form Adventures in Stereo with Simon Dine. In 2019, Beattie briefly reunited with Primal Scream for a one off performance in Glasgow.

Discography
with Primal Scream
AlbumsSonic Flower Groove (1987), Elevation – UK No. 62

Singles
"All Fall Down" (1985), Creation
"Crystal Crescent" (1986), Creation
"Gentle Tuesday" (1987), Elevation
"Imperial" (1987), Elevation

with Spirea Xsee Spirea X#Discographywith Adventures in Stereosee Adventures in Stereo#Discography''

References

Scottish pop guitarists
Scottish keyboardists
Scottish songwriters
Living people
Year of birth missing (living people)